Operation Austin IV was a search and destroy operation conducted by the 1st Brigade, 101st Airborne Division and the 173rd Airborne Brigade in western Quang Duc and Phước Long Provinces, from 1 to 18 May 1966.

Prelude
Operation Austin IV was a search and destroy operation near the Cambodian border in II Corps.

Operation
On 1 May the 2nd Battalion, 502nd Infantry Regiment conducted a helicopter assault near Bu Prang Camp and patrolled the area until 6 May without making any contact with the PAVN. Also on 1 May the 1st Battalion, 327th Infantry Regiment was deployed by helicopter onto 2 infiltration routes from Cambodia and patrolled the area until 8 May without making any contact.

On 6 May following intelligence indicating the presence of enemy forces near the abandoned Special Forces base at Bù Gia Mập, the 2/502nd was moved from Bu Prang to Bù Gia Mập and were joined by A Troop 17th Cavalry Regiment on 8 May and the 1/327th on 10 May. On 10 May Company A, 2/502nd captured a soldier from the PAVN 141st Regiment who revealed that 4 companies of his unit were waiting in an ambush nearby. On 11 May Company A, 2/502nd and A/17th Cavalry encircled the PAVN ambush position and then called in air and artillery strikes, which resulted in claims of the destruction of most of a PAVN battalion.

On 14 May a B-52 strike took place northwest of Bù Gia Mập and 2/502nd and 2nd Battalion, 503rd Infantry Regiment were sent into the area to exploit the strike but met only scattered resistance. On 17 May 2/502nd was flown out of Bù Gia Mập to Nhon Co, while 2/503rd was flown by helicopter to Sông Bé Base Camp. On 18 May 1/327th was flown out to Nhon Co.

Aftermath
Operation Austin IV officially concluded on 18 May, with the US claiming PAVN losses were at 101 killed, 148 estimated killed and 6 captured, U.S. losses were 9 killed.

References

Conflicts in 1966
1966 in Vietnam
Battles involving the United States
Battles involving Vietnam
Battles and operations of the Vietnam War in 1966
History of Bình Phước Province
History of Đắk Nông Province